Robert Knudson (September 29, 1925 – January 21, 2006) was an American sound engineer. He won three Academy Awards for Best Sound and was nominated for seven more in the same category. He worked on more than 100 films between 1963 and 1995.

Selected filmography
Knudson won three Academy Awards and was nominated for seven more:

Won
 Cabaret (1972)
 The Exorcist (1973)
 E.T. the Extra-Terrestrial (1982)

Nominated
 A Star Is Born (1976)
 Sorcerer (1977)
 Close Encounters of the Third Kind (1977)
 Hooper (1978)
 1941 (1979)
 Empire of the Sun (1987)
 Who Framed Roger Rabbit (1988)

References

External links

1925 births
2006 deaths
20th-century American engineers
American audio engineers
Best Sound BAFTA Award winners
Best Sound Mixing Academy Award winners
Engineers from California
People from Los Angeles